Augustinópolis is a municipality located in the Brazilian state of Tocantins. Its population was 18,643 (2020) and its area is 395 km².

References

Municipalities in Tocantins